Visitors to Montenegro must obtain a visa from one of the Montenegrin diplomatic missions unless they come from one of the visa exempt countries. Visa policy is regulated by Regulation on Visa Regime Act. Where there are no diplomatic or consular representations of Montenegro, visa requiring foreigners may obtain them from (depending on the country) diplomatic or consular representations of Serbia, Bulgaria and Croatia.

The visa policy of Montenegro is similar to the visa policy of the Schengen Area. It grants 90-day visa-free entry to all Schengen Annex II nationalities, except for Kiribati, Marshall Islands, Micronesia, Palau, Solomon Islands, Tonga and Tuvalu. It also grants visa-free entry to nationals of several additional countries – Azerbaijan, Belarus, Cuba, Ecuador, Kazakhstan, Kosovo, Kuwait, Qatar, Russia, and Turkey.

Visitors must hold passports that are valid for at least 3 months beyond the period of intended stay.

Visa policy map

Visa-free travel
Citizens of the following countries can stay for up to 90 days without a visa.

Ordinary passports
Citizens and holders of ordinary passports of the following 97 countries and territories can enter Montenegro without a visa up to 90 days (unless otherwise noted):

1 - including British passports endorsed British National (Overseas) and British Overseas Territories Citizen, issued to residents of Bermuda.
2 - can enter with an ID card (incl. Irish passport card and Gibraltar identity card) and stay without a residence permit for 30 days.
3 - can enter with a biometric ID card and stay without a residence permit for 30 days.
4 - provided a passport includes a Personal ID number.
* Saudi Arabian citizens do not need visitor's visa to enter between 01-06-2022 to 30-09-2022 for 30 days.

Diplomatic and service passports
Nationals of the following countries can visit Montenegro if they are holding a diplomatic passport:

Nationals of the following countries can visit Montenegro if they are holding a diplomatic or service passport:

Holders of a Laissez-Passer, issued by the United Nations, provided travelling on duty can also visit Montenegro visa-free.

Foreign visa holders
Nationals of any country may visit Montenegro without a visa for up to 30 days if they hold a passport with visas issued by Ireland, a Schengen Area member state, the United Kingdom, Canada or the United States or if they are permanent residents of those countries. Residents of the United Arab Emirates do not require a visa for up to 10 days, if they hold a return ticket and proof of accommodation.

Refugees issued with a refugee travel document by Australia, Canada, Iceland, Japan, New Zealand, Norway, Switzerland, United States, or an EU member state can visit Montenegro without a visa for up to 30 days.

Reciprocity

Montenegrin citizens can enter, without a visa, some of the countries whose citizens are granted visa-free access to Montenegro but require a visa for Antigua and Barbuda, Australia, Azerbaijan (grants eVisa), Bahamas, Barbados, Brunei, Canada, El Salvador, Grenada (grants visa on arrival), Guatemala, Honduras, Ireland, Japan, Kazakhstan, Kuwait, Malaysia, Mauritius (grants visa on arrival), Mexico, New Zealand, Nicaragua (grants visa on arrival), Paraguay, Qatar (grants visa on arrival), Taiwan (grants eVisa), United Kingdom, United States and Venezuela.

See also

 Visa policy of the Schengen Area
 Visa requirements for Montenegrin citizens

References

4- https://www.gov.me/en/diplomatic-missions/embassies-and-consulates-of-montenegro/saudi-arabia

External links
 Overview of visa regimes for foreign citizens

Montenegro
Foreign relations of Montenegro